Mark Gerson is an American investor, businessman, and philanthropist. He co-founded the Gerson Lehrman Group (GLG) and Thuzio. Gerson is also involved in philanthropic organizations African Mission Healthcare Foundation and United Hatzalah.

Gerson grew up in the Short Hills neighborhood of Millburn, New Jersey and attended Millburn High School. He received a BA from Williams College and a JD from Yale Law School.

Business
Gerson and fellow Yale Law School graduate Thomas Lehrman founded the Gerson Lehrman Group in 1998. Gerson Lehrman group, otherwise known as GLG, is a peer to peer business learning company.  GLG is a knowledge brokerage and primary research firm with a stated membership-based platform of more than 600,000 independent consultants.

Gerson also co-founded Thuzio, a professional booking marketplace, with former NFL player Tiki Barber, and Create, a venture studio.

Gerson helped found the Tel Aviv Angel Group which invested in early stage Israeli startups and later on Maverick Ventures Israel, a venture capital fund composed of private investors that invests in early growth Israeli startups. Gerson serves on the fund’s board of advisors .

Philanthropy
Gerson is the co-founder and chairman of United Hatzalah, a network of volunteer medics in Israel. 

Gerson co-founded African Mission Healthcare Foundation with Dr. Jon Fielder in 2010. The Foundation seeks to improve access to medical care in Africa. AMHF supports the work of Christian medical missionaries serving in Africa in three areas: clinical care, training and infrastructure.

AMHF has forged partnerships with Christian Broadcasting Network and Samaritan's Purse 

As part of AMHF, Gerson helped create the Gerson L'Chaim Prize in August 2016.

In September 2021 Gerson donated US$18 million to Christian medical missions in Africa.

L'Chaim Prize for Outstanding Medical Missionary Service 
The L'Chaim Prize for Outstanding Medical Missionary Service was founded by Gerson and his wife Erica Gerson.  The L'Chaim Prize is a $500,000 grant aimed to award medical missionaries for their service and help them fund their mission. Due to the rise in independent churches, Gerson believed that there was a shortage of medical missionaries and believed this prize would help the field. The prize's name, L'Chaim, means "to life" in Hebrew.

Recipients

Media
On Gerson's podcast The Rabbi's Husband with Mark Gerson he interviews a thinker with religious, political or theological perspectives regarding a passage from the Torah. Guests have included United States Senators  Cory Booker,  Tom Cotton,  William Cassidy, Israeli author Yossi Klein Halevi, speechwriter Sarah Hurwitz and Bishop Robert Stearns. He also hosts a weekly Bible study with Eagles Wings, an international Christian organization supporting Israel initiatives.

He is the author of the national best-selling book The Telling: How Judaism's Essential Book Reveals the Meaning of Life (St. Martins Publishing Group, March 2, 2021)  and The Telling Workbook: An Interactive Guide to the Haggadah (St. Martins Publishing Group, March 8, 2022).

Politics
Gerson is the author of  the books The Neoconservative Vision: From the Cold War to the Culture Wars and In the Classroom: Dispatches from an Inner-City School that Works, and the editor of The Essential Neoconservative Reader.

He is active politically, with most support going to Republican candidates. In 2015, Gerson joined other Republicans in signing an amicus curiae brief supporting a constitutional right to same-sex marriage, which was submitted to the Supreme Court in Obergefell v. Hodges.

References

Living people
Yale Law School alumni
Williams College alumni
Medical missionaries
American philanthropists
Year of birth missing (living people)
Millburn High School alumni
People from Millburn, New Jersey